Krubera peregrina is a species of plants in the family Apiaceae. It is the only species in the genus ''Krubera.

Sources

References 

Apioideae
Flora of Malta